The 2017–18 season is R&F's 2nd season in the top-tier division in Hong Kong football. R&F will compete in the Premier League, Senior Challenge Shield, FA Cup and Sapling Cup in this season. In June 2017, R&F was allowed to move their home stadium to Yanzigang Stadium, Guangzhou and register 3 foreigners for the 2017–18 Hong Kong Premier League.

Coaching staff
{|class="wikitable"
|-
!Position
!Staff
|-
|rowspan="2"|Head coach|| Marek Zając (to 12 March 2018)
|-
| Bito Wu (from 12 March 2018)
|-
|Team leader||rowspan="2"| Wu Weian
|-
|Assistant coach
|-
|Assistant coach|| Andy McNeil
|-
|Goalkeeping coach|| Sun Ce
|-
|Team physician|| Liu Yihao
|-
|Physiotherapist|| Liu Zhixing

Squad

Summer
As of 18 August 2017

Winter
As of 2 February 2018

Transfers

In

Summer

Winter

Out

Summer

Winter

Pre-season and friendlies

Training matches

Competitions

Hong Kong Premier League

Table

Results by round

Results summary

League Matches

Hong Kong FA Cup

Hong Kong Senior Challenge Shield

Hong Kong Sapling Cup

Statistics

Appearances and goals

Goalscorers

Disciplinary record

References

R&F (HK) seasons
Hong Kong football clubs 2017–18 season